Larry Lee Smarr is a physicist and leader in scientific computing, supercomputer applications, and Internet infrastructure from Missouri. He currently works at the University of California, San Diego. Smarr has been among the most important synthesizers and conductors of innovation, discovery, and commercialization of new technologies – including areas as disparate as the Web browser and personalized medicine. In his career, Smarr has made pioneering breakthroughs in research on black holes, spearheaded the use of supercomputers for academic research, and presided over some of the major innovations that created the modern Internet. For nearly 20 years, he has been building a new model for academic research based on interdisciplinary collaboration.

Education
Larry Smarr received his Bachelor of Arts and Master of Science degrees from the University of Missouri in Columbia, Missouri and received a PhD in physics from the University of Texas at Austin in 1975.

Research
After graduating, Smarr did research at Princeton, Yale, and Harvard, and then joined the faculty of the University of Illinois at Urbana-Champaign in 1979.   He is a professor of Computer Science and Information Technologies at the University of California, San Diego.

While at Illinois, Larry Smarr wrote an ambitious proposal to address the future needs of scientific research. Seven other University of Illinois professors joined as co-Principal Investigators, and many others provided descriptions of what could be accomplished if the proposal were accepted. Formally titled A Center for Scientific and Engineering Supercomputing  but known as the Black Proposal (after the color of its cover), it was submitted to the National Science Foundation in 1983. A scant 10 pages long, it was the first unsolicited proposal accepted and approved by the NSF, and resulted in the charter of four supercomputer centers (Cornell, Illinois, Princeton, and San Diego), with a fifth (Pittsburgh) added later. In 1985 Smarr became the first director of the Illinois center, the National Center for Supercomputing Applications.

Smarr continued to promote the benefits of technological innovation to scientific research, such as his advocacy of a high-speed network linking the national centers, which became the NSFNET, one of the significant predecessors of today's Internet.  When the NSF revised its funding of supercomputer centers in 1997, Smarr became director of the National Computational Science Alliance, linking dozens of universities and research labs with NCSA to prototype the concept of grid computing.

In 2000, Larry Smarr moved to California and proposed the creation of the California Institute for Telecommunications and Information Technology (Calit2), linking departments and researchers at UCSD and UC Irvine.  Smarr served as Institute Director of Calit2 from its founding until his retirement in 2020.

As part of the work of Calit2, he is Principal Investigator on the NSF OptIPuter LambdaGrid project, an "optical backplane for planetary scale distributed computing" and the CAMERA Project, a high-performance computing resource for genomic research.

He attended the Beyond Belief symposium in November 2006 and presented at the 2010 and 2012 Life Extension Conferences.

Since 2012, Larry Smarr has been engaged in a computer-aided study of his own body.

Awards and honors
Larry Smarr has received numerous honors and awards, including:

 Member of the National Academy of Engineering
 Fellow of the American Physical Society
 Fellow of the American Academy of Arts and Sciences
 Franklin Institute's Delmer S. Fahrney Medal for Leadership in Science or Technology (1990)
 Telluride Tech Festival Award of Technology (2005)
 Golden Goose Award for his work involving black holes and supercomputering. (2014)
 Member of the San Diego Science Festival's Nifty Fifty, a collection of the most influential scientists in the San Diego area.

References 

Living people
21st-century American physicists
Physicists from Missouri
Scientists from Missouri
Members of the United States National Academy of Engineering
Fellows of the American Academy of Arts and Sciences
University of Missouri alumni
University of Texas at Austin College of Natural Sciences alumni
Harvard University staff
Fellows of the American Physical Society
1948 births